Rajiv Gulshan  Rai  (born 18 July 1955) is an Indian film director, screenwriter and film editor. He is the son of the producer Gulshan Rai. He has directed many films under his father's production company Trimurti Films.

He made his debut as a director with the 1985 action film Yudh. He went on to write and direct several hit films in the action and thriller genres: Tridev (1989), Vishwatma (1992), Mohra (1994), and Gupt (1997). His films are also notable for their hit music composed by Kalyanji-Anandji (in Tridev) and Viju Shah in all his subsequent films.

He married Bollywood actress Sonam, whom he had directed in Tridev and Vishwatma in 1989 and 1992 respectively. He has one child with her. They divorced in 2016. In 1997, he had to leave India with his family for the UK after a failed attempt to kill him by hitmen believed to be working for the Mumbai underworld leader Abu Salem.

After a four-year hiatus from the Bollywood industry, he returned to directing by introducing Arjun Rampal with his comeback venture Pyaar Ishq Aur Mohabbat (2001). This was an attempt by Rai at directing a romantic drama, a change from his previous action films. The film failed at the box office and Rai returned to the action genre with his next film Asambhav (2004), again starring Arjun Rampal, which also failed to do well. Shortly after the release of Asambhav his father died at the age of 80 of a prolonged illness. He was not  active in Bollywood between 2004 and 2021, and returned to film making in 2022. Rai is currently working on his next, action thriller titled Zora. The filming began on August 11, 2022, in Jaipur. The film is all set to be released in July 2023.

Filmography

References

External links

Rajiv Rai's Zora (Official Instagram handle for the film)

1955 births
Filmfare Awards winners
Hindi-language film directors
Film directors from Mumbai
Living people
20th-century Indian film directors